Operación Triunfo is a Spanish reality television music competition to find new singing talent. The sixth  series, also known as Operación Triunfo 2008, aired on Telecinco from 8 April 2008 to 22 July 2008, presented by Jesús Vázquez.

Virginia Maestro was the winner of the series.

Headmaster, judges and presenter
Headmaster: Àngel Llàcer
Judges: Noemí Galera, Risto Mejide, Javier Llano and Coco Comín
Presenter: Jesús Vázquez

Contestants

Galas

Results summary
Colour key

Gala 0 (8 April 2008)
Musical guest: Mónica Naranjo ("Europa")

Gala 1 (15 April 2008)
Musical guest: Duffy ("Mercy")

Gala 2 (22 April 2008)
Musical guest: Lorena Gómez ("Maniac") (with the contestants)

Gala 3 (29 April 2008)
Musical guests:
Lenny Kravitz ("I'll Be Waiting)
Craig David ("Officially Yours")

Gala 4 (6 May 2008)
Musical guest: Rosario Flores ("No dudaría") (with the contestants) & ("Algo contigo")

Gala 5 (13 May 2008)
Musical guests:
Mónica Naranjo ("Amor y lujo") (with the contestants)
Alejandro Fernández ("Te Voy A Perder")

Gala 6 (20 May 2008)
Musical guest: Sergio Dalma ("A buena hora")

Gala 7 (27 May 2008)
Musical guest: David Bustamante ("Cobarde")

Gala 8 (3 June 2008)
Musical guest: Carlos Baute ("Ángelito") (with the contestants)

Gala 9 (10 June 2008)
Group performance: "Agua"
Musical guest: Leona Lewis ("Bleeding Love")

Gala 10 (17 June 2008)
Musical guests:
Melocos and Natalia Jiménez ("Cuando me vaya")
Songs: OneRepublic ("Apologize")

Gala 11 (24 June 2008)
Musical guests:
Merche ("Ya no me digas lo siento")
Juanes ("Gotas de Agua Dulce")

Gala 12 (1 July 2008)
Musical guests:
Luis Fonsi ("No Me Doy por Vencido")
Gerónimo Rauch ("Getsemaní")

Gala 13 (8 July 2008)
Musical guests:
Rihanna ("Don't Stop the Music")
Rihanna and David Bisbal ("Hate That I Love You")

Gala 14 (15 July 2008)
Musical guests:
Daniel Diges and Macarena García ("Vuela")
Kate Ryan ("Ella, elle l'a")
Soraya Arnelas ("Words")
Kate Ryan and Soraya Arnelas ("No Digas Que No")

Gala Final (22 July 2008)
Musical guests:
Mónica Naranjo ("Todo mentira")
La Quinta Estación ("La frase tonta de la semana")

External links
Official website (Telecinco)
Official website (Portalmix)
Live videos of the program

Operación Triunfo
2008 Spanish television seasons